Below are tables of the clubs that have won the Cup Winners' Cup.

Performances

By club

By nation

By manager

Four managers hold the record of winning the competition on two occasions:
 Nereo Rocco: 1968 and 1973 (Milan)
 Valeriy Lobanovskyi in 1975 and 1986 (Dynamo Kyiv)
 Johan Cruyff: 1987 (Ajax) and 1989 (Barcelona)
 Alex Ferguson: 1983 (Aberdeen) and 1991 (Manchester United)

By player
Most UEFA Cup Winners' Cup titles: Lobo Carrasco (3) 
 FC Barcelona (3): (1978–79, 1981–82, 1988–89)

Clubs

By number of appearances

(Years marked in bold denote Cups won by the respective club)

By semi-final appearances
{|class="wikitable sortable"
|-
!Club
!No.
!Years
|-
| Barcelona||align="center"|6||1969, 1979, 1982, 1989, 1991, 1997
|-
| Atlético Madrid||align="center"|5||1962, 1963, 1977, 1986, 1993
|-
| Chelsea||align="center"|4||1971, 1995, 1998, 1999
|-
| Anderlecht||align="center"|4||1976, 1977, 1978, 1990
|-
| Bayern Munich||align="center"|4||1967, 1968, 1972, 1985
|-
| Paris Saint-Germain||align="center"|3||1994, 1996, 1997
|-
| Fiorentina||align="center"|3||1961, 1962, 1997
|-
| Feyenoord||align="center"|3||1981, 1992, 1996
|-
| Arsenal||align="center"|3||1980, 1994, 1995
|-
| Sampdoria||align="center"|3||1989, 1990, 1995
|-
| Zaragoza||align="center"|3||1965, 1987, 1995|-
| Juventus||align="center"|3||1980, 1984, 1991
|-
| Dynamo Moscow||align="center"|3||1972, 1978, 1985
|-
| West Ham United||align="center"|3||1965, 1966, 1976|-
| Milan||align="center"|3||1968, 1973, 1974|-
| Rangers||align="center"|3||1961, 1967, 1972|-
| Lokomotiv Moscow||align="center"|2||1998, 1999
|-
| Liverpool||align="center"|2||1966, 1997
|-
| Rapid Wien||align="center"|2||1985, 1996|-
| Parma||align="center"|2||1993, 1994|-
| Benfica||align="center"|2||1981, 1994
|-
| Monaco||align="center"|2||1990, 1992|-
| Manchester United||align="center"|2||1984, 1991|-
| Mechelen||align="center"|2||1988, 1989
|-
| Ajax||align="center"|2||1987, 1988|-
| Dynamo Kyiv||align="center"|2||1975, 1986|-
| Aberdeen||align="center"|2||1983, 1984
|-
| Austria Wien||align="center"|2||1978, 1983
|-
| Real Madrid||align="center"|2||1971, 1983|-
| Dinamo Tbilisi||align="center"|2||1981, 1982
|-
| Standard Liège||align="center"|2||1967, 1982|-
| Tottenham Hotspur||align="center"|2||1963, 1982
|-
| Carl Zeiss Jena||align="center"|2||1962, 1981|-
| Hamburger SV||align="center"|2||1968, 1977|-
| PSV Eindhoven||align="center"|2||1971, 1975
|-
| Sporting CP||align="center"|2||1964, 1974
|-
| Manchester City||align="center"|2||1970, 1971
|-
| Celtic||align="center"|2||1964, 1966
|-
| Lazio||align="center"|1||1999|-
| Mallorca||align="center"|1||1999|-
| VfB Stuttgart||align="center"|1||1998|-
| Vicenza||align="center"|1||1998
|-
| Deportivo La Coruña||align="center"|1||1996
|-
| Antwerp||align="center"|1||1993|-
| Spartak Moscow||align="center"|1||1993
|-
| Club Brugge||align="center"|1||1992
|-
| Werder Bremen||align="center"|1||1992|-
| Legia Warsaw||align="center"|1||1991
|-
| Dinamo București||align="center"|1||1990
|-
| CSKA Sofia||align="center"|1||1989
|-
| Atalanta||align="center"|1||1988
|-
| Marseille||align="center"|1||1988
|-
| Bordeaux||align="center"|1||1987
|-
| Lokomotive Leipzig||align="center"|1||1987|-
| Bayer Uerdingen||align="center"|1||1986
|-
| Dukla Prague||align="center"|1||1986
|-
| Everton||align="center"|1||1985|-
| Porto||align="center"|1||1984|-
| Waterschei Thor||align="center"|1||1983
|-
| Nantes||align="center"|1||1980
|-
| Valencia||align="center"|1||1980|-
| Baník Ostrava||align="center"|1||1979
|-
| Beveren||align="center"|1||1979
|-
| Fortuna Düsseldorf||align="center"|1||1979|-
| Twente||align="center"|1||1978
|-
| Napoli||align="center"|1||1977
|-
| BSG Sachsenring Zwickau||align="center"|1||1976
|-
| Eintracht Frankfurt||align="center"|1||1976
|-
| Ferencváros||align="center"|1||1975|-
| Red Star Belgrade||align="center"|1||1975
|-
| Borussia Mönchengladbach||align="center"|1||1974
|-
| 1. FC Magdeburg||align="center"|1||1974|-
| Hajduk Split||align="center"|1||1973
|-
| Leeds United||align="center"|1||1973|-
| Sparta Prague||align="center"|1||1973
|-
| Dynamo Berlin||align="center"|1||1972
|-
| Górnik Zabrze||align="center"|1||1970|-
| Roma||align="center"|1||1970
|-
| Schalke 04||align="center"|1||1970
|-
| 1. FC Köln||align="center"|1||1969
|-
| Dunfermline Athletic||align="center"|1||1969
|-
| Slovan Bratislava||align="center"|1||1969|-
| Cardiff City||align="center"|1||1968
|-
| Slavia Sofia||align="center"|1||1967
|-
| Borussia Dortmund||align="center"|1||1966|-
| 1860 Munich||align="center"|1||1965|-
| Torino||align="center"|1||1965
|-
| Lyon||align="center"|1||1964
|-
| MTK Budapest||align="center"|1||1964|-
| 1. FC Nürnberg||align="center"|1||1963
|-
| OFK Beograd||align="center"|1||1963
|-
| Újpest||align="center"|1||1962
|-
| Dinamo Zagreb||align="center"|1||1961
|-
| Wolverhampton Wanderers||align="center"|1||1961
|}

Trivia and records
For the 1994–95 season, England had two representatives in the tournament, neither of which were the domestic cup winners. The first was Arsenal, who were the Cup Winners' Cup holders, and the second was Chelsea, who had lost the 1994 FA Cup final to double winners Manchester United, who had qualified for the 1994–95 UEFA Champions League. Both Arsenal and Chelsea were eliminated from the competition by eventual winners Real Zaragoza of Spain.
For the 1996-97 season, the same situation happened for France. The first was Paris Saint-Germain F.C., who were the trophy holders, and the second was Nîmes Olympique, who had lost the Coupe de France final against AJ Auxerre, who had qualified for the 1996-97 UEFA Champions League.
Largest margin of victory in a final: 1962–63, Tottenham Hotspur 5–1 Atlético Madrid
Most goals in a final: 1978–79, Barcelona 4–3 Fortuna Düsseldorf
Most goals in a match: 1963–64, Sporting CP 16–1 APOEL (European Cups record)

Consecutive participations
It was uncommon for clubs to participate in more than two consecutive Cup Winners' Cups, but the following clubs did so.5 seasons4 seasons3 seasons'''

Domestic champions
Five clubs won their domestic leagues and the Cup Winners' Cup in the same season.

Undefeated champions

Notes

Scoring records

All-time top scorers

Most goals in a single season

Most goals in a match

Most goals in a two-legged tie

Largest margin of victory in a match

Largest margin of victory in an away match

Largest margin of victory in a two-legged tie

Highest-scoring matches with at least three goals for each side

Below is a list of matches with at least eight goals scored, including at least three by each side.

Most goals in a two-legged tie without advancing
The following sides scored five or more goals over a two-legged tie, but were still eliminated from the competition.

Biggest two-legged comebacks
Below is a list of two-legged ties where a side qualified for the next round after trailing the tie at some point by three goals or more, or by two goals along with an away goal deficit.

Single match
In the entire history of the Cup Winners' Cup, there was only one instance where a side avoided defeat after trailing by three or more goals during a single match:

 Vålerenga were trailing 3–0 to Beşiktaş after 40 minutes in the 1998–99 second round, but managed to finish the game 3–3.

See also
 UEFA club competition records and statistics
 Intercontinental Cup records and statistics

External links
 RSSSF CWC trivia